Charles W. Pruitt (May 28, 1930 – August 5, 1985) was an American politician and Tennessee State Representative from Nashville, representing the 58th district from 1970 until 1985.

Pruitt was born and raised in Huntsville, Alabama and moved to Nashville, Tennessee in 1949. He married Mary Johnson in 1960 and had three children. Pruitt was employed by the Western Electric Company. Pruitt died of a heart attack in 1985, while still in office. His vacant seat was first filled by Charles J. Walker, appointed by the Metro Council, then by his widow Mary after a special election held October 15, 1985.

References

1930 births
1985 deaths
Politicians from Huntsville, Alabama
Politicians from Nashville, Tennessee
Democratic Party members of the Tennessee House of Representatives
20th-century American politicians